Stroud Green is a suburb and electoral ward in north London, England, split between the London boroughs of Haringey and Islington. On its south-western side, Stroud Green Road forms part of the boundary between the two boroughs.

Stroud Green Road is the main local hub and shopping area. At its eastern end it intersects Seven Sisters Road and Blackstock Road at a major crossroads. Stroud Green Road is a populous thoroughfare linking Crouch Hill with the major north London transport interchange of Finsbury Park station.

History

Toponymy 
In 1407, the area was called Strode, which is formed from the Old English 'stōd' and means 'marshy ground covered with brushwood'. It is recorded as Stowde Grene in 1546, the 'grene' suffix is Middle English and means 'village green'.

Locale

Stroud Green Road 
The neighbourhood high street, Stroud Green Road, includes a wide range of restaurants and other mainly independent shops.  There are also two high-street supermarkets.

The Finsbury Park end of the road, though different in character to the stretch further north, is currently benefitting from a large regeneration scheme centred on Finsbury Park town centre.

The folk record label Topic Records was based at 48–50 Stroud Green Road and many folk LPs were recorded there. The label has since moved to Uppingham in Rutland.

Library 
In the east of the neighbourhood, next to Harringay railway station is the Stroud Green & Harringay Library.

Transport 
Stroud Green Road runs north west from the transport hub of Finsbury Park station, and stops just 150 yards south east of Crouch Hill railway station on the Gospel Oak to Barking line. On the eastern border of Stroud Green is Harringay railway station on the Great Northern Line. London bus routes W3, W7, and 210 run the length of Stroud Green Road, terminating at Finsbury Park. The low railway bridge at Finsbury Park prevents bus routes running directly from areas north of Finsbury Park such as Stroud Green Road directly into central London.

Stroud Green railway station closed in 1954. It was on the Finsbury Park to Edgware line, and along with nearby Crouch End railway station had been planned to be added to the Northern line of London Underground, but World War II intervened.

References

External links 
 Stroud Green Community bulletin board
 Stroud Green Flickr Group
 Stroud Green Primary School
 Finsbury Park + Stroud Green Neighbourhood Forum

Areas of London
Districts of the London Borough of Haringey
Places formerly in Middlesex